This is a list of senators of French Algeria, senators who have represented departments of French Algeria in the senate of France.

Third Republic

Senators for Algerian departments under the French Third Republic were:

Fourth Republic

Senators for Algerian departments under the French Fourth Republic were:

Fifth republic

Senators under the French Fifth Republic served for three years from 1959 until the Independence of Algeria in 1962.

References

Sources

 
French Algeria
French Senate
Political history of Algeria